Cracked Tiles is the debut album of Zug Izland. Released on January 28, 2003, the album peaked at #48 on the Billboard Heatseekers chart and at #31 on the Top Independent Albums chart.

Track listing

Personnel
Information taken from Allmusic.

Musicians
Syn — lead vocals
Mike Puwal — guitar
Little Pig — drums
Dan Miller — keyboards
Guido Milligan - bass
Anybody Killa — rap 
Blaze Ya Dead Homie — rap 
Violent J — arranger, background vocals, vocal harmony 
Insane Clown Posse — rap 
Jamie Madrox — rap 
Shaggy 2 Dope — scratching, cut, background vocals
Joy Sparks — vocals

Additional personnel
Tom Baker — mastering 
Joseph Bruce — producer, editing, design, concept
Mike Puwal — programming

References

2003 albums
Albums produced by Joseph Bruce
Psychopathic Records albums
Zug Izland albums